Wolfgang Müller (born 19 April 1936) is a German weightlifter. He competed in the men's middle heavyweight event at the 1960 Summer Olympics.

References

1936 births
Living people
German male weightlifters
Olympic weightlifters of the United Team of Germany
Weightlifters at the 1960 Summer Olympics
Sportspeople from Dresden